Radhika is an Indian choreographer. She works predominantly in Tamil, Telugu, Hindi, Kannada and Malayalam films. She learned dance from Uduppi Lakshman Narayan starting at the age of six.

Early life 
Radhika started her career at age 12 as a dancer in the movie Thalattu directed by T.K.Rajendran.

Film career 
Radhika has 20 years of experience in dance choreography. She worked with Tarun Kumar, Brinda, Raju Sundaram, Chinni Prakash, and Raghava Lawrence. She has worked on more than 100 films. Her first independent film was Mugamoodi, directed by Mysskin. She choreographed all the songs in this film.

Filmography

2012 and 2013 projects

2014 projects

References

1976 births
Living people
Indian choreographers